The National League of American Pen Women, Inc. (NLAPW) is a not-for-profit 501(c)(3) membership organization for women.

History
The first meeting of the League of American Pen Women was organized in 1897 by Marian Longfellow O'Donoghue, a writer for newspapers in Washington D.C. and Boston. Together with Margaret Sullivan Burke and Anna Sanborn Hamilton they established a "progressive press union" for the women writers of Washington."

Seventeen women joined them at first, professional credentials were required for membership and the ladies determined that Pen Women should always be paid for their work. By September 1898, members were over fifty members "from Maine to Texas, from New York to California."

In 1921 the association became The National League of American Pen Women with thirty-five local branches in various states.

The League's headquarters are located in the historic Pen Arts Building and Art Museum in the DuPont Circle area of Washington.

Notable members

 Daisy Kessler Biermann
 Amy Ella Blanchard
 Gail Horton Calmerton
 Sarah Johnson Cocke
 Margaret Wootten Collier
 Edith Daley
 Bernice C. Downing
 Caroline B. Eager
 Alice Henson Ernst
 Inglis Fletcher
 May Futrelle
 Gladys Goldstein
 Jeanette Lawrence
 Nancy A. Leatherwood
 Ada Jordan Pray
 Edith Daggett Rockwood
 Vingie E. Roe
 Eleanor Roosevelt
 Geneve L. A. Shaffer
 Lura Eugenie Brown Smith
 Margaret McClure Stitt
 An-Ming Wang
 Elenor Yorke
 Zitkala-Sa

References

Business organizations based in the United States
Women's political advocacy groups in the United States
Women's occupational organizations
Organizations established in 1897
1897 establishments in Washington, D.C.